José Correa González (December 27, 1980 in Río Piedras, Puerto Rico - April 23, 2015 in Reading, Pennsylvania) was a Puerto Rican professional boxer.

Professional career

On March 23, 2007 Correa lost to Edwin Vázquez Galíndez in a fight for the WBA Fedecaribe welterweight title.

References

External links

Welterweight boxers
1980 births
Living people
Puerto Rican male boxers
People from Río Piedras, Puerto Rico